James Charles Harrison (2 February 1921 – 19 July 2004) was an English professional footballer who played as a left back in the Football League for Aston Villa, Coventry City and Leicester City.

Career statistics

References

English footballers
English Football League players
1921 births
2004 deaths
Leicester City F.C. players
Aston Villa F.C. players
Coventry City F.C. players
Corby Town F.C. players
Brentford F.C. wartime guest players
Hinckley Athletic F.C. players
Association football fullbacks
FA Cup Final players